Asbury First United Methodist Church is located on East Avenue in Rochester, New York, United States. It traces its heritage to several Rochester congregations dating back to the 1820s.  In its current form, it is the result of a 1934 merger of First Church and Asbury Methodist Episcopal Church. With a congregation of 2,300 people, it is the largest United Methodist church in the Rochester area.

Asbury First presents an annual concert series featuring regional musicians and national touring groups. The Asbury First Dining and Caring Center serves meals to the homeless; the Asbury First Storehouse provides donated clothing, kitchenware, and bedding. The church also supports a Grocery Bag Ministry, Rochester Area Interfaith Hospitality Network, School 41 tutoring and outreach, and projects in India, Nicaragua, and Kenya.

Located in the East Avenue Historic District, the church property features several historic buildings, including the 1953 Gothic Sanctuary, and 1050 East Ave., also called the Wilson Soule House, a stone edifice that is one of Rochester's finest examples of Richardsonian Romanesque style.

History

Origin 
Asbury First United Methodist Church is the result of the union of two churches and five denominations. The First Wesleyan Methodist Episcopal Church of the village of Rochester was formed in 1821. Asbury M.E. Church was formed in 1836 by Methodists who lived on the east side of the Genesee River.

Both First and Asbury survived hard depressions in the 1840s and 1850s to remain strong influences in the city. A strong Sunday School was developed early, and has continually been a feature of Asbury, First, and Asbury First Churches.
In 1866, Asbury Church purchased a pipe organ, the first Methodist Church to include instrumental music in a service. The building housing First Church burned in 1933. A few months later the First and Asbury congregations united.

Campus Architecture
The present church building was constructed in 1953-55 in the American Gothic style.  The education wing was added in 1961. The stained glass windows were designed by George Haushalter. The construction and style owes much to the dedication of Dr. Weldon Crossland, minister for 28 years.

Two mansions are also part of the campus. 1050 East Ave (The Wilson Soule House) is considered one of the most important 19th century houses surviving in Rochester; it was built in 1890. From 1894 to 1905 George Eastman and his mother lived in the house. Eastman had a darkroom constructed in the basement (now the Asbury First Storehouse) and made other changes to the interior. The building now houses the church's administrative offices. 1010 East Avenue was built in 1907 in a Tudor style, and now houses the Dining and Caring Center and church meeting rooms.

References

External links

 AsburyFirst Website
 AFUMC - Music Program

United Methodist Church
Churches in Rochester, New York